Sanemon was a Japanese castaway who drifted ashore in Kamchatka with nine others in 1710. After being immured for a period in the fortress of Verkhne-Kamchatsk, in 1713 he joined Ivan Petrovitch Kozyrevski's expedition to the northern Kuriles. The following year he was sent to Saint Petersburg, where he is said to have become Dembei's assistant at the Japanese language school founded in the city by Peter the Great.

References

Castaways
Japanese emigrants to Russia
Year of birth unknown
Year of death unknown
Japan–Russia relations
People of Edo-period Japan